An inland construction tender is a type of ship used to build and service shore structures such as piers and buoy trestles.  It is also used to maintain buoys and aids to navigation.  Less frequently, they may be used for law enforcement, environmental, icebreaking, and search and rescue operations.

The United States Coast Guard currently has three classes of inland construction tenders designated as WLIC.

160-foot class inland construction tender

100-foot class inland construction tender

75-foot class inland construction tender

See also
USCG coastal buoy tender
USCG inland buoy tender
USCG seagoing buoy tender

References

Construction Tender Inland